Pureland Industrial Complex is a  industrial park located in Logan Township in Gloucester County, New Jersey, United States. Interstate 295, U.S. Route 322 and U.S. Route 130 run through it and connect it to major truck routes. SMS Rail Lines connect to Penns Grove Secondary and the national rail network. It was opened in 1975 and is the largest industrial park in the state of New Jersey, and one of the largest in the world.

Companies 
Companies or organizations with offices, warehouses, or manufacturing facilities in Pureland include:

Amazon.com
Mitsubishi
VWR Scientific
Mercedes-Benz
Mannington Mills
US Postal Service
Home Depot
Lockheed Martin
Nextel
Pep Boys
Flowserve
Target Corporation

References

External links 
Pureland Industrial Complex website

Industrial parks in the United States
Buildings and structures in Gloucester County, New Jersey
Economy of New Jersey
Industrial buildings and structures in New Jersey
Companies based in Gloucester County, New Jersey